Fred Boyd (born 1950) is an American former professional basketball player

Fred Boyd could also refer to: 
Fred Boyd (baseball) (1898–1923), American Negro leagues baseball player 
Fred J. Boyd, Australian pharmacist

See also
Frederick Boyd (disambiguation)